is a Japanese politician of the Democratic Party of Japan, a member of the House of Councillors in the Diet (national legislature). A native of Tōhaku District, Tottori and graduate of Aoyama Gakuin University, he was elected to the House of Councillors for the first time in 2003 after serving in the assembly of Tottori Prefecture for two terms. He lost his seat in 2005 but was re-elected in 2007.

References

External links 
  in Japanese.

Aoyama Gakuin University alumni
Members of the House of Representatives (Japan)
Members of the House of Councillors (Japan)
Politicians from Tottori Prefecture
Living people
1950 births
Democratic Party of Japan politicians
21st-century Japanese politicians